Curtis Karl Merz (April 17, 1938 – April 22, 2022) was a former college and professional American football guard who played seven seasons in the American Football League (AFL) from 1962–1968. He started for the 1966 AFL Champion Kansas City Chiefs and in Super Bowl I.

Born in Newark, New Jersey, Merz was raised in Springfield Township, Union County, New Jersey and played prep football at Jonathan Dayton High School.

Merz also played one season in the Canadian Football League (CFL) with the 1960 Grey Cup champion Ottawa Rough Riders.

After his football career, Merz became a Kansas City broadcaster where he did a morning talk show in 1986. Rush Limbaugh did a segment for the show. The station was KMBZ.

See also
Other American Football League players

References

External links

1938 births
2022 deaths
Jonathan Dayton High School alumni
People from Springfield Township, Union County, New Jersey
Players of American football from Newark, New Jersey
Players of Canadian football from Newark, New Jersey
Sportspeople from Union County, New Jersey
American football offensive guards
Iowa Hawkeyes football players
Dallas Texans (AFL) players
Kansas City Chiefs players
Ottawa Rough Riders players
American Football League players